11/7 may refer to:
November 7 (month-day date notation)
July 11 (day-month date notation)
2006 Mumbai train bombings, held on 11 July
11 shillings and 7 pence in UK predecimal currency

See also
117 (disambiguation)
7/11 (disambiguation)